Edward Green may refer to:

 Sir Edward Green, 1st Baronet (1831–1923), English ironmaster and Conservative MP for Wakefield 1874 and 1885–92
 Edward B. Green (judge), first Chief Justice of the Oklahoma Territorial Supreme Court (1890-1893)
 Edward Brodhead Green (1855–1950), American architect
 Edward C. Green (born 1944), director of the Harvard University AIDS Prevention Research Project
 Edward D. Green, (February 25, 1865 - ?) state legislator in Illinois
 Edward Ernest Green (1861–1949), English entomologist
 Edward Howland Robinson Green (1868–1936), known as Colonel Green, American philatelist and numismatist
 Edward J. Green (born c. 1947), American economist
 Ted Green (Edward Joseph Green, 1940-2019), Canadian ice hockey player
 Edward L. Greene (1884–1952), sometimes spelt Green, American football player and coach of football and baseball
 Edward T. Green (1837–1896), U.S. federal judge
 Edward Tony Green (born 1956), American bass player
 Edward Green, inventor (1845) of the fuel economizer
 Ed Green (baseball) (1860–1912), pitcher in Major League Baseball
 Ed Green, character in the NBC crime drama Law & Order

See also
 Edward Green Shoes, English shoemaker
 Edward Greene (disambiguation)